GSAT-17 is an Indian communications satellite. Built by ISRO and operated by INSAT, it carries 24 C-band, 2 lower C-band, 12 upper C-band, 2 CxS (C-band up/S-band down), and 1 SxC (S-band up/C-band down) transponders. It additionally carries a dedicated transponder for data relay (DRT) and search-and-rescue (SAR) services. At the time of launch, GSAT-17 was the heaviest satellite built by ISRO.

The satellite was launched on 28 June 2017 aboard an Ariane 5 ECA rocket from the Guiana Space Centre in Kourou, French Guiana. GSAT-17 is the 21st satellite from ISRO to be launched by Arianespace.

References

GSAT satellites
Ariane commercial payloads
Spacecraft launched by India in 2017